This is a timeline of Vietnamese history under Chinese rule from the 3rd century BC to 905.

3rd century BC

2nd century BC

1st century

2nd century

3rd century

4th century

5th century

6th century

7th century

8th century

9th century

10th century

Gallery

See also
Annam (province) (Annan)
Tĩnh Hải quân (Jinghai Jun)
Timeline of the Lý dynasty

Citations

Bibliography

 

History of Vietnam
Timelines of historically non-Chinese states in China